Wintin may refer to:

 Wintin, a brand name of the generic drug Lorazepam
 Win Tin, (1930 – 2014), a Burmese journalist, politician, and political prisoner

See also
 Winton (disambiguation)